Aleksandr Aleksandrovich Korotkov (born 13 January 1987) is a Russian professional football coach and a former player. He is an assistant coach with FC Kolomna.

Club career
He played three seasons in the Russian Football National League for FC Tekstilshchik-Telekom Ivanovo, FC Sportakademklub Moscow and FC Khimik Dzerzhinsk.

External links
 
 

1987 births
People from Belebey
Living people
Russian footballers
Russia youth international footballers
Russia under-21 international footballers
Association football midfielders
FC Zenit Saint Petersburg players
FC Tekstilshchik Ivanovo players
FC Torpedo Moscow players
FC Chernomorets Novorossiysk players
FC Tyumen players
FC Khimik Dzerzhinsk players
FC Veles Moscow players
FC Sportakademklub Moscow players